Jurgen Çelhaka (born 6 December 2000) is an Albanian professional footballer who plays as a midfielder for Polish club Legia Warsaw.

Career statistics

Club

Notes

Honours
Tirana
 Kategoria Superiore: 2019–20
 Kategoria e Parë: 2017–18

References

External links

2000 births
Living people
Footballers from Tirana
Albanian footballers
Albania youth international footballers
Albania under-21 international footballers
Association football midfielders
Kategoria Superiore players
Kategoria e Parë players
Ekstraklasa players
III liga players
KF Tirana players
Legia Warsaw players
Legia Warsaw II players
Expatriate footballers in Poland